Tom Donchez (born March 10, 1952) is a former American football running back. He played for the Chicago Bears in 1975.

References

1952 births
Living people
American football running backs
Penn State Nittany Lions football players
Chicago Bears players